Esaki was a former Michelin 3-star sushi restaurant located in the Hills Aoyama building in Shibuya. It is owned and operated by sushi chef Shintaro Esaki. Since September 2018, it has relocated near Southern Yatsugatake Volcanic Group and away from Tokyo.

Restaurant
Esaki is located in the basement of an office building. The restaurant's decor has been described as modern and minimal.

See also
 List of Japanese restaurants
 List of Michelin three starred restaurants
 List of sushi restaurants

References

External links
 

Tourist attractions in Tokyo
Restaurants in Tokyo
Michelin Guide starred restaurants in Japan
Sushi restaurants in Japan
Defunct Japanese restaurants
Defunct restaurants in Japan